Lord Gowrie may refer to:

 Grey Ruthven, 2nd Earl of Gowrie (1939-2021), British politician
 Alexander Hore-Ruthven, 1st Earl of Gowrie (1872–1955), British soldier, longest-serving Governor-General of Australia
 John Ruthven, 3rd Earl of Gowrie (c. 1570–1600), Scottish nobleman
 James Ruthven, 2nd Earl of Gowrie (1575–1588), Scottish nobleman, Earl of Gowrie
 William Ruthven, 1st Earl of Gowrie (c. 1540–1584), Scottish nobleman

See also
 Earl of Gowrie